Sinan Gümüş (born 15 January 1994) is a German professional footballer who plays as a forward for Süper Lig club Antalyaspor.

Club career

Early years
Born in Pfullendorf to Turkish parents, Gümüş is a youth product of TSV Aach-Linz and SC Pfullendorf. In 2011, after having spent ten years there, he moved to VfB Stuttgart's youth academy, signing a three-year contract. After the contract had expired, he left the club.

Galatasaray
In July 2014, Gümüş joined Turkish club Galatasaray on a free transfer, signing a five-year contract. Other Turkish teams had also been interested in signing him. He made his first-team debut in the Turkish Cup on 16 December 2014, coming on in the second half with one goal and assist in a 9–1 win.

He made his league debut on 12 September 2015 and scored his first goal in the league on 27 December 2015. He continued his goalscoring run both in the league and the cup; scoring six goals plus one assist in seven games between December 2015 and January 2016. He scored his first hat-trick for the club in a 4–1 cup win against Kastamonuspor on 26 January 2016. On 19 May 2016, Gümüş scored another hat-trick in the last match of the season.

On 11 March 2018, Sinan Gümüş came on as a sub for Ryan Donk against Konyaspor in the second half when the score was 0–1 to the opponent, he went on to contribute one goal and one assist consequently winning the game 2–1 and being awarded man of the match.

Genoa
On 2 July 2019, Gümüş signed with Italian Serie A club Genoa.

Loan to Antalyaspor
On 20 January 2020, Gümüş joined Antalyaspor on loan until 30 June 2020.

Fenerbahçe
On 19 August 2020, Gümüş signed with another Süper Lig club Fenerbahçe. He made his debut  with the club in a 2–1 away win over Çaykur Rizespor as a substitute for Ferdi Kadıoğlu in the 65th minute on 11 September 2020. He scored his first goal for the club in a 2–1 home win against Alanyaspor on 7 January 2021.

On 8 February 2022, his contract with Fenerbahçe was terminated.

Return to Antalyaspor
On 8 February 2022, Gümüş signed a two-and-a-half-year deal with Antalyaspor.

International career
In October 2013, Gümüş earned three caps for the Germany U20 team.

Career statistics

Club

Honours
Galatasaray
 Süper Lig: 2014–15, 2017–18, 2018–19
 Türkiye Kupası: 2014–15, 2015–16, 2018–19
 Süper Kupa: 2015, 2016

References

External links

 
 
 Player profile at kicker.de (in German)

Living people
1994 births
People from Pfullendorf
Sportspeople from Tübingen (region)
German people of Turkish descent
German footballers
Footballers from Baden-Württemberg
Association football forwards
Germany youth international footballers
3. Liga players
Süper Lig players
Serie A players
VfB Stuttgart II players
Galatasaray S.K. footballers
Genoa C.F.C. players
Antalyaspor footballers
Fenerbahçe S.K. footballers
German expatriate footballers
German expatriate sportspeople in Italy
Expatriate footballers in Italy